Aleksandr Viktorovich Lukyanov (born 19 August 1949) is a Russian coxswain who competed for the Soviet Union in the 1976 Summer Olympics, in the 1980 Summer Olympics, and in the 1988 Summer Olympics and for Russia in the 1996 Summer Olympics and in the 2000 Summer Olympics.

He was born in Moscow.

In 1976 he was the coxswain of the Soviet boat which won the gold medal in the coxed four event.

Four years later he won the silver medal as cox of the Soviet boat in the coxed pair competition.

At the 1988 Games he won his second silver medal when he coxed the Soviet eight.

In Atlanta at the 1996 Olympics he represented Russia and won the bronze medal as part of the Russian boat in the eight contest.

His final Olympic appearance was at the Sydney Games where he finished ninth with the Russian boat in the 2000 eight event.

References

External links
 

1949 births
Living people
Russian male rowers
Soviet male rowers
Coxswains (rowing)
Olympic rowers of the Soviet Union
Olympic rowers of Russia
Rowers at the 1976 Summer Olympics
Rowers at the 1980 Summer Olympics
Rowers at the 1988 Summer Olympics
Rowers at the 1996 Summer Olympics
Rowers at the 2000 Summer Olympics
Olympic gold medalists for the Soviet Union
Olympic silver medalists for the Soviet Union
Olympic bronze medalists for Russia
Olympic medalists in rowing
World Rowing Championships medalists for Russia
World Rowing Championships medalists for the Soviet Union
Medalists at the 1996 Summer Olympics
Medalists at the 1988 Summer Olympics
Medalists at the 1980 Summer Olympics
Medalists at the 1976 Summer Olympics
European Rowing Championships medalists